Thioacetic acid is an organosulfur compound with the molecular formula . It is the sulfur analogue of acetic acid, as implied by the thio- prefix. It is a yellow liquid with a strong thiol-like odor. It is used in organic synthesis for the introduction of thiol groups in molecules.

Synthesis and properties
Thioacetic acid is prepared by the reaction of acetic anhydride with hydrogen sulfide:
(CH3C(O))2O + H2S -> CH3C(O)SH + CH3C(O)OH

It has also been produced by the action of phosphorus pentasulfide on glacial acetic acid, followed by distillation.
CH3C(O)OH + P2S5 -> CH3C(O)SH + P2OS4

Thioacetic acid is typically contaminated by acetic acid.

The compound exists exclusively as the thiol tautomer, consistent with the strength of the  double bond. Reflecting the influence of hydrogen-bonding, the boiling point (93 °C) and melting points are 20 and 75 K lower than those for acetic acid.

Reactivity

Acidity
With a pKa near 3.4, thioacetic acid is about 15 times more acidic than acetic acid. The conjugate base is thioacetate:
CH3C(O)SH -> CH3C(O)S- + H+
In neutral water, thioacetic acid is fully ionized.

Reactivity of thioacetate
Most of the reactivity of thioacetic acid arises from the conjugate base, thioacetate. Salts of this anion, e.g. potassium thioacetate, are used to generate thioacetate esters. Thioacetate esters undergo hydrolysis to give thiols. A typical method for preparing a thiol from an alkyl halide using thioacetic acid proceeds in four discrete steps, some of which can be conducted sequentially in the same flask:
CH3C(O)SH + NaOH -> CH3C(O)SNa + H2O
CH3C(O)SNa{} + RX -> CH3C(O)SR{} + NaX \qquad (X\ =\ Cl,\ Br,\ I,\ \dots)
CH3C(O)SR + 2 NaOH -> CH3CO2Na + RSNa + H2O
RSNa + HCl -> RSH + NaCl

In an application that illustrates the use of its radical behavior, thioacetic acid is used with AIBN in a free radical mediated nucleophilic addition to an exocyclic alkene forming a thioester:

Reductive acetylation 
Salts of thioacetic acid such as potassium thioacetate can be used to do one-step conversion of nitroarenes to aryl acetamides. This is particularly useful in pharmaceutical preparations, e.g. paracetamol.

References

Organic acids
Reagents for organic chemistry
Organosulfur compounds
Foul-smelling chemicals